Sir Edward Penderel Moon, OBE (1905–1987) was a British administrator in India and a writer. He served as a finance minister for the Bahawalpur State in the British Raj. After India's independence, he stayed on in India and worked as the chief commissioner of Himachal Pradesh, as chief commissioner of Manipur state.

Life and career 
Moon was born 13 November 1905 in Mayfair, London to a cardiologist, Robert Oswald Moon who wrote about philosophy and Greek medicine as well as diseases of the heart. Dr Moon also stood several times as a Liberal candidate for parliament. He followed in his father's footsteps, first to Winchester College, then to New College, Oxford. In 1927, he was elected a prize fellow of All Souls College, Oxford. He joined the Indian Civil Service in 1929, being posted to the Punjab.

He wrote several books on British rule in India including Divide and Quit.

Works
 Divide and Quit
 Warren Hastings and British India
 The British Conquest and Dominion of India: 1858-1947
 Strangers in India
 The Partition Omnibus
 Gandhi and Modern India

References

Further reading
 

1905 births
1987 deaths
20th-century British male writers
Bahawalpur (princely state)
People from Mayfair
People educated at Winchester College
Indian Civil Service (British India) officers
Fellows of All Souls College, Oxford
Alumni of New College, Oxford
Officers of the Order of the British Empire
Knights Bachelor